
One South Wacker is a 550 ft (168 m) tall skyscraper in Chicago, Illinois, United States. It was constructed from 1979 to 1982 and has 40 floors. Murphy/Jahn, Inc. Architects designed the building, which is tied for the 72nd tallest building in Chicago.

The tower is featured in the music video for the Daft Punk song Burnin'.

Tenants
 HNTB 
 Century Aluminum
 Invenergy

See also
 List of tallest buildings in Chicago

References

External links
 
 

Skyscraper office buildings in Chicago
1982 establishments in Illinois
Office buildings completed in 1982
Helmut Jahn buildings